Ragnheiður Pétursdóttir Melsteð (born 6 May 1971) is the co-founder and former executive producer of LazyTown Entertainment.

Personal life
Ragnheiður was born to Valgerður Hanna and Pétur Melsteð, who was a known hairdresser in Iceland and was in charge of a magazine called Hár og fegurð for 25 years.

She was married to Magnús Scheving from 1989 until their divorce in 2014. They have a daughter and a son.

References

1971 births
Living people
Ragnheidur Melsted